The 1967 Preakness Stakes was the 92nd running of the $200,000 Preakness Stakes thoroughbred horse race. The race took place on May 20, 1967, and was televised in the United States on the CBS television network. Damascus, who was jockeyed by Bill Shoemaker, won the race by two and one quarter lengths over runner-up In Reality. Approximate post time was 5:31 p.m. Eastern Time. The race was run on a fast track in a final time of 1:55-1/5. The Maryland Jockey Club reported total attendance of 38,371, this is recorded as second highest on the list of American thoroughbred racing top attended events for North America in 1967.

Payout 

The 92nd Preakness Stakes Payout Schedule

The full chart 

 Winning Breeder: Edith W. Bancroft; (KY)
 Winning Time: 1:55 1/5
 Track Condition: Fast
 Total Attendance: 38,371

References

External links 
 

1967
1967 in horse racing
1967 in American sports
1967 in sports in Maryland
Horse races in Maryland